Melbury Down is an area of downland in northern Dorset, England.

It is owned by the National Trust.

The chalk grassland here supports large butterfly populations, including very large numbers of Chalkhill Blue, and a colony of Silver-spotted Skipper.

External links
 Fontmell and Melbury Downs - National Trust

Nature reserves in Dorset
National Trust properties in Dorset